Sticharium is a genus of clinids native to the coastal waters of southern Australia.

Species
Two recognized species are in this genus:
 Sticharium clarkae A. George & V. G. Springer, 1980 (dusky crawler)
 Sticharium dorsale Günther, 1867 (sand crawler)

References

 
Clinidae
Taxa named by Albert Günther
Marine fish genera